My Goal's Beyond is the third solo album (after Extrapolation and Devotion) by guitarist John McLaughlin. The album was originally released in 1971 on Douglas Records in the US. It was later reissued by Douglas/Casablanca (1976), Elektra/Musician (1982), and in 1987 by Rykodisc on CD and LP.

This album marks the first chronological major stylistic change from McLaughlin, apart from his move to an acoustic guitar. The music is strongly influenced by music of India, and was dedicated to McLaughlin's spiritual leader, Indian guru Sri Chinmoy. Side one has two longer pieces for the whole band, including soprano saxophonist/flautist Dave Liebman, violinist Jerry Goodman and percussionists Airto and Badal Roy. Side two of the album features eight short compositions (five standards and three originals) played by McLaughlin on double-tracked acoustic guitars, with occasional punctuation on various cymbals by Billy Cobham.

Track listing
Douglas – KZ 30766

Personnel 
 John McLaughlin – acoustic guitar
 Billy Cobham – drums
 Charlie Haden – bass
 Jerry Goodman – violin
 Dave Liebman – flute, soprano saxophone
 Airto Moreira – percussion
 Badal Roy – tabla
 Mahalakshmi (Eve McLaughlin) – tanpura (Indian drone instrument)

Chart performance

See also 
 John McLaughlin discography

Notes 

1971 albums
John McLaughlin (musician) albums
Elektra/Musician albums